Harvick is a surname. Notable people with the surname include:

 DeLana Harvick (born 1973), former co-owner and manager of Kevin Harvick Incorporated and Kevin Harvick's wife
 Kevin Harvick (born 1975), American professional stock car racing driver
 Kerry Harvick (born 1974), American country music artist